Aure is a commune in the Ardennes department in the Grand Est region of north-eastern France.

Geography
Aure is located some 55 km east of Reims and some 20 km south by south-west of Vouziers. The western border of the commune is the border between Ardennes and Marne departments. Access to the commune is by road D6 from Manre in the south-east which passes through the village and continues south-west, changing to the D20 in Marne, to Sommepy-Tahure. The D306 goes north-east from the village to Monthois. The commune is entirely farmland.

The Allin river rises near the village and flows south-east to eventually join the Aisne at Brécy-Brières.

History
Aure is cited in a poem by Louis Aragon Le conscrit des cent villages (The conscript of 100 villages) written as an act of intellectual resistance in a clandestine manner in 1943.

French Decorations

Croix de guerre 1914-1918: awarded on 1 March 1921.

Neighbouring communes and villages

Administration

List of Successive Mayors

Demography
In 2017 the commune had 48 inhabitants.

Notable people linked to the commune
Auguste Achile Baudart, Colonel of the 122nd Infantry Regiment of the Line, born in Aure on 16 November 1844 from a farming family, died at Montpellier on 15 December 1898.

Photo gallery

See also
Communes of the Ardennes department

References

External links
Aure on Géoportail, National Geographic Institute (IGN) website 
Aure on the 1750 Cassini Map

Communes of Ardennes (department)